Count  was the titular head of the Higashifushimi-no-miya, an extinct branch of the Imperial House of Japan, and a Buddhist monk. He was the youngest brother of Empress Kōjun and was the maternal uncle of Emperor Emeritus Akihito. If he had kept his imperial status, at the time of his death he would have been the oldest-ever member of the Japanese imperial family.

Life
Count Higashifushimi Kunihide was born as Prince , the youngest child of Lieutenant Colonel Prince Kuniyoshi Kuni (1873–1929) and his wife, the former Shimazu Chikako (1879–1956). Prince Kuni's uncle, Admiral Prince Higashifushimi Yorihito, the head of the Higashifushimi-no-miya line, had no heirs; consequently, following consultations with his father, Prince Kunihide was given to the custody of his great-uncle and his wife on 26 October 1919, though not formally adopted. Upon attaining his majority in 1930, he sat in the House of Peers as an imperial prince until the following year, when the Emperor, his cousin and brother-in-law, requested him to relinquish his imperial status to perpetuate the Higashifushimi name. Upon leaving the imperial family, he was ennobled as Count Higashifushimi and appointed a Grand Cordon of the Order of the Paulownia Flowers. He held the title of count until October 1947, when the nobility and cadet branches of the imperial family lost their status.

After taking a degree in history from Kyoto Imperial University, he taught as a lecturer at the university until 1952, when he took his vows as a Buddhist priest in the Zenkō-ji daikanshin in Nagano, becoming the abbot of the Tendai Buddhist Shōren'in Temple in Kyoto the following year, taking the Buddhist name . He took a PhD in Asuka period art from Kyoto University in 1956. He was appointed chairman of the Kyoto Association of Buddhist Temples in 1985, serving until his death. As chairman, he led the opposition to a ¥50 temple admission fee imposed by the city of Kyoto, denouncing it as "contrary to the principle of separation of church and state and freedom of religion." The fee was subsequently repealed.

In 2004, he passed the position of abbot of the Shōren'in to his second son, Jiko Higashifushimi, becoming its emeritus abbot. In poor health since 2009, he died on 1 January 2014, aged 103.

Ancestry

See also
 List of centenarians (royalty and nobility)

References

1910 births
2014 deaths
Japanese Buddhist clergy
Kazoku
Kunihide
Japanese centenarians
Academic staff of Kyoto University
Kyoto University alumni
Men centenarians